The 35th César Awards ceremony was presented by the Académie des Arts et Techniques du Cinéma in Paris to honour its selection of the best films of 2009 on 27 February 2010. The ceremony was chaired by Marion Cotillard, with Valérie Lemercier and Gad Elmaleh acting as the host. Harrison Ford was presented with an Honorary César by Sigourney Weaver.

Winners and nominees

Viewers
The show was followed by 1.7 million viewers. This corresponds to 9.1% of the audience.

Special tributes
During the ceremony, actor Fabrice Luchini presented a tribute to filmmaker Éric Rohmer, who had died the month before.

See also
 82nd Academy Awards
 63rd British Academy Film Awards
 22nd European Film Awards
 15th Lumières Awards

References

External links

 Official website
 
 35th César Awards at AlloCiné

2010
2010 film awards
2010 in French cinema